Abdoulaye Niang (born 9 January 1983) is a Senegalese–French footballer who last played for Stade Bordelais.

Biography
In December 2009, he was signed by Italian club Sorrento. Due to his French passport, he is not affected by the ban of international signing of non-EU players of Italian lower divisions clubs. In May 2010 he signed a new 1-year contract with club.

References

External links
 
 
 Football.it Profile 
 

1983 births
Living people
Senegalese footballers
Senegalese expatriate footballers
Pau FC players
Louhans-Cuiseaux FC players
Kavala F.C. players
Ethnikos Achna FC players
A.S.D. Sorrento players
Football League (Greece) players
Cypriot First Division players
Association football midfielders
Expatriate footballers in Greece
Expatriate footballers in Cyprus
Expatriate footballers in Italy
Senegalese expatriate sportspeople in Greece
Senegalese expatriate sportspeople in Cyprus
Senegalese expatriate sportspeople in Italy
French sportspeople of Senegalese descent
People from Dakar Region